Pekinška Patka (Serbian Cyrillic: Пекиншка Патка; trans. Peking Duck) is an eminent Serbian and former Yugoslav punk rock band from Novi Sad. Their debut album, Plitka poezija, released in 1980, is considered the first punk rock album by a band coming from Serbia. Being one of the first punk acts in Yugoslavia, they played a major role in opening doors for many bands that came after.

On their second and final album, Strah od monotonije, released in 1981, they turned towards post-punk and darkwave sound, disbanding during the same year. In 2008, the band reunited to perform on the main stage of Exit Festival alongside Sex Pistols, and in 2010, they reunited once again, continuing their activity.

History

Trafo, Café Express, band formation 
Pekinška Patka's roots are found in Trafo, a short-lived cover band formed in 1976 by electric guitarist Sreten Kovačević with Nebojša Čonkić providing the vocals. Further featuring Štrc on bass and Zare on drums, the band performed rock standards covers of The Rolling Stones, Santana, Deep Purple, etc. The following year, Kovačević formed Café Express, a pop band featuring Čonkić as guest vocalist in addition to Boba Mama on guitar, Aleksandar Čerevicki on keyboards, Aleksandar Kravić on bass, Laslo "Cila" Pihler (Shital Puri) on drums, and vocalist Aleksandar Krstić.

During early summer 1978, twenty-five-year-old Čonkić (nicknamed Profesor Čonta), at the time employed as teacher at Mihajlo Pupin High School in Novi Sad, visited London where, among various acts, he saw The Clash, The Specials, Midge Ure, Glen Matlock's Rich Kids, The Skids, and Magazine perform live, before returning home to Yugoslavia full of impressions and ideas about putting together a band with a new sound.

In July 1978, Kovačević, drummer Laslo "Cila" Pihler decided to form a punk rock group inspired by the British punk bands. The first lineup also featured bass guitarist Miloš "Žure" Žurić. The band held rehearsals at the University of Novi Sad's Faculty of Mechanical Engineering building where their first live performance took place. Four people attended the gig, all of them friends of the band members. After that, Čonkić and Kovačević started working on new material, mainly in Serbian language. Soon, Srbislav "Srba" Dobanovački became the new bass guitarist.

Local prominence in Novi Sad 
The band's first official live appearance took place in December 1978 at Novi Sad's Klub 24 venue and immediately got the local public talking due to the commotion it raised among the club's staff who were sufficiently shocked by the performance that they decided to put a stop to it, sending the crowd of about 200 youngsters home. The immediate reason was the band's performance of an impromptu vulgar punk cover of a communist youth work action song featuring the modified lyrics "Brižit Bardo bere čičke; Vidi joj se pola pičke" ("Brigitte Bardot is picking thistles; half of her pussy is hanging out").

The band based their act on melodic punk and vivid public image with high-energy live shows featuring constant jumping and gyrating that had a strong effect on the young crowds. Being one of the first groups in the country with this kind of sound and performing style, they attracted media interest before releasing any material. Čonkić often used those media appearances for self-promotion, delivering sweeping statements like: "We're the first important thing to happen to Yugoslav rock since the days of Ivo Robić and Marko Novoselić". He also purposely courted controversy with soundbites such as referring to his group as the "first Orthodox punk band", which went against the doctrine of the ruling Communist League (SKJ) that very much promoted atheism in Yugoslav society.

The band quickly developed a cult following among the sections of Novi Sad youth who expressed their devotion by spraying "Čonta je Bog" ("Čonta is God") graffiti throughout the city. All of this unconventionality also got the band plenty of attention from local communist authorities who saw subversive and incendiary potential in their sound and appearance. As a result, despite generating a lot of interest, not only in the city but also throughout other parts of Vojvodina, the band experienced problems with live performances, many of which would get canceled on the day of the show on suggestions from the authorities.

In December 1978, the band played the last BOOM Festival, which was being held in their hometown that year.

Wider popularity and first releases 
The band appeared at the Festival Omladina with the song "Bela šljiva". Vesna Vrandečić (later to join Xenia) won the festival's main award, but Pekinška Patka got the Audience Award. Their whole performance was broadcast on national television which was the first TV appearance of any punk band in Yugoslavia. This raised their profile as far as Yugoslav recording companies were concerned; they started negotiating with PGP-RTB label about a debut album, but ultimately could not reach a deal. The band continued playing and soon developed a wider following in bigger Yugoslav cities: Belgrade, Sarajevo and Zagreb. They eventually signed with Jugoton after its representatives saw them perform at Zagreb's Kulušić club.

The first Pekinška Patka release became a vinyl 7-inch single (2-side) "Bela šljiva" / "Biti ružan, pametan i mlad" produced by Slobodan Konjović. Relatively good reception of that single, with 35,000 copies sold, paved the way for them to begin recording a full-length debut album.

In October 1979, the band was invited to perform in the village of Stepanovićevo at the anniversary celebration of the end of World War II. The band performed their standard set-list and the show also featured blowing of condoms and throwing them to the audience as well as swearing on stage that was met with a mixture of shock and delight by the audience. Another punk rock band, Gomila G (a censored version of their original name Gomila Govana, trans. Pile of Shit), which played as the opening act, performed the song "God save Martin Bormann", which was also the reason why the authorities and the media turned against the two bands. Soon after the show, Gomila G bassist Borislav "Bora" Oslovčan joined Pekinška Patka as replacement for Dobanovački. Together they recorded a demo, consisting of seven tracks, which was unofficially released during the 1990s. The new lineup also performed at the Leto na Adi manifestation, which was held at a luxurious raft at Ada Ciganlija, with the song "Poderimo rock". Since the crowd rushed to the stage and jumped around, the raft almost sank.

The album Plitka poezija (Shallow Poetry), a punk rock material with occasional ska elements and humorous lyrics, was completed by fall 1979, but Yugoslav president Josip Broz Tito's illness postponed the release until summer 1980. It was ushered in by another 7-inch single, "Bolje da nosim kratku kosu" / "Ori, ori". The whole material was recorded in the Boris Kovač studio, outside Novi Sad, and was produced by Slobodan Konjović, well known disc jockey from Studio B radio station. Eventually, their debut album was released in 1980 and sold about 15,000 copies, which Jugoton considered a failure.

One of the first live presentations of the new material was at the Split festival with the band Azra. Several thousand people attended the concert. The relations within the band were somewhat strained at this gig. Dissatisfied with the band's decision to go on tour of Bosnia and Herzegovina, bassist Oslovčan played with his back turned to the crowd, while actively sabotaging the proceedings by purposely making the band sound as bad as possible.

Lineup changes, post-punk period 
Following the debut album release, the band went through some personnel changes with some members changing instruments and others leaving altogether. Guitarist Kovačević expressed a desire to play saxophone so he moved to that instrument while new member Zoran "Bale" Bulatović, a 17-year-old Pečat member, took over the vacated guitar spot. Second guitarist Prosenica, and bassist Oslovčan also left the band. Oslovčan was first replaced by Aleksandar "Caki" Kravić and then the former bassist Srba Dobanovački until Marinko Vukmanović joined the band. Prosenica's spot stayed vacant as the band continued with only one guitar. That lineup did not last long as Kovačević left the group during fall 1980 to form his own band, Kontraritam.

The new lineup went on the successful Bosnia and Herzegovina tour, ending with a sold-out show at Sarajevo's Skenderija Hall. The band recorded the cover of the popular Dragan Stojnić chanson "Bila je tako lijepa", with altered lyrics, and released it on single with "Buba-rumba" as the B-side. Another cover version, this time The Hollies' hit "Stop! Stop! Stop!", appeared on the "Rokenroler" show broadcast on TV Belgrade. The song was used by JRT (Yugoslav Radio Television) station for representing Yugoslavia at the Montreux Rose d'Or festival. Čonkić also planned to cover the "Hymn to Saint Sava", which was not approved by the rest of the band.

During December 1980, the band performed at the Grok festival held at the Novi Sad Fair. The band left a good impression, but also caused an uproar by burning a copy of the Borba newspaper. During the intro for the song "Biti ružan, pametan i mlad", Čonkić said that the song was dedicated to Bijelo Dugme leader Goran Bregović. Soon after the show, Dnevnik journalist Bogdan Četnik wrote an article demanding the band to be completely banned.

From October 1980 until March 1981 the band prepared new material inspired by Joy Division, The Stranglers, The Cure and Magazine. The band changed the style to post-punk and dark wave, presenting a different sound and image, which mostly failed to connect with the audiences the way their debut did. The album Strah od monotonije (Fear of Monotony), released in May 1981, was sold in about 8,000 copies.

The band performed rarely and their last notable shows were at a large concert at Zagreb Velesajam (performing with Riblja Čorba, Haustor, Film, Prljavo kazalište, Leb i Sol, Parni Valjak, and other bands) and the Kalemegdan park which was their last concert, During the summer, Čonkić went to serve the Yugoslav People's Army and by the time he returned, Bulatović was already the member of Luna and Vukmanović formed the pop band Primavera.

Post-breakup and reunions 
In 1994, Čonkić emigrated to Toronto, Ontario, Canada with his family and, after working as a pizza deliverer and computer programmer at Canada's state broadcaster CBC, he got a job as lecturer at Seneca College in Toronto. Bulatović moved to New York City during the 1990s.

In 1997, their complete discography, including singles and albums, was re-released on CD format by Croatia Records (legal successor of Jugoton). Then on July 5, 2006, the same was done by Serbian Multimedia Records at which time the band got a significant promotional push from Serbian web magazine Popboks.

On May 28, 2008, it was announced that Pekinška Patka would be reuniting to perform at the 2008 EXIT festival. Their performance took place on EXIT main stage on Sunday July 13, 2008 - the festival's closing night - together with Sex Pistols, The Hives, and Ministry. Pekinška Patka played a 40-minute set consisting of old favorites. In the interviews immediately after the reunion performance, Čonkić left the door open for a full comeback.

After pulling out of a Novi Sad performance for New Year's 2010, the band decided to reconvene again for a show on 21 May 2010 at Belgrade's SKC in order to celebrate the 30th anniversary of the "Bila je tako lijepa" single release. The band reunited in the lineup which recorded the single and the second studio album, Strah od monotonije, and after the Belgrade performance, they played at the Zagreb Boogaloo club.

On May 5, at a press conference, the band announced the release of a cover album, featuring songs performed at the Yugoslav 1960s pop festivals such as the Opatija, Beogradsko Proleće and Vaš Šlager Sezone.

A few days before the upcoming concert in Belgrade, the first lineup guitarist, and the co-founding member of the band, Sreten Kovačević, announced suing the band over the usage of the name Pekinška Patka as well as the performance of the songs from the Plitka poezija album for which he is credited as author in SOKOJ (The Serbian Copyright Protection Organization). In the response to the announcement, the band responded at the Long Play record label official site with the explanation that Čonkić has the right to the band name, and that in July 1980, without previously informing the rest of the band, Kovačević had signed co-authorship to the debut album tracks at SOKOJ, thus the information on the authorship and at SOKOJ mismatch.

Both the Belgrade and Zagreb performances featured the band playing most of the tracks from Plitka poezija, with the exception of the song "Bolje da nosim kratku kosu" written by Kovačević according to SOKOJ, the upcoming single, the cover version of Luz Casal song "Un año de amor", and the song "Neko", from the second album Strah od monotonije. However, the Belgrade performance did not feature Pihler on drums, and the substitute drummer was Veliki Prezir drummer Robert Radić.

In December 2010, the band released a free digital download MP3 version of the single "Un año de amor" on the Long Play record label official site.

Former bassist Borislav "Bora" Oslovčan died on October 5, 2017 at the age of 56.

Legacy
The album Plitka poezija was polled in 1998 as 77th on the list of 100 greatest Yugoslav popular music albums in the book YU 100: najbolji albumi jugoslovenske rok i pop muzike (YU 100: The Best albums of Yugoslav pop and rock music).

In 2000, the song "Bolje da nosim kratku kosu" was polled No.39 on the Rock Express Top 100 Yugoslav Rock Songs of All Times list. In 2006, the same song was polled No.22 on the B92 Top 100 Domestic Songs list.

Discography 

 Plitka poezija (1980)
 Strah od monotonije (1981)

See also
Punk rock in Yugoslavia
New wave music in Yugoslavia

Notes

References
Branislav Smuk: Plitkom poezijom protiv monotonije, Akuzativ.com 
Dragan Pavlov and Dejan Šunjka: Punk u Jugoslaviji (Punk in Yugoslavia), publisher: IGP Dedalus, Yugoslavia, 1990 
Janjatović, Petar.  EX YU ROCK enciklopedija 1960-2006.  
NS Rockopedija, novosadska rock scena 1963-2003, Bogomir Mijatović, Publisher: SWITCH, 2005
Janjatović, Petar. Drugom stranom - Almanah novog talasa u SFRJ. 
Pekinška Patka info at Multimedia Records 
Pekinška Patka Complete Discography CD by Multimedia Records 
Branko Kostelnik - Moj život je novi val, knjiga intervjua, publisher: Fraktura, Zagreb, Croatia, 2004 
Bogomir Mijatović, "NS rockopedija, novosadska rock scena 1963-2003",Publisher: SWITCH, 2005

External links
Official site
MySpace fan page
Pekinška Patka at Youtube
Pekinška Patka at Last.fm
Pekinška Patka at Rateyourmusic
Pekinška Patka 2006 compilation homepage

Serbian punk rock groups
Serbian new wave musical groups
Serbian post-punk music groups
Yugoslav punk rock groups
Serbian dark wave musical groups
Musical groups from Novi Sad
Musical groups established in 1978